Lanarce is a commune in the Ardèche department in southern France.

Geography
The village of Lanarce, situated along a busy road between Montélimar to Le Puy-en-Velay demonstrates the difficulty of Ardeche mountain life. Built more than 1000m above sea level, it is covered in snowdrifts and swamps, depending on the season. Lanarce has interesting volcanic geography, with bog-filled maars—low volcanic craters.

Population

Local sites
 The Auberge de Peyrebeille, or Auberge rouge, an old inn now serving as a museum covering the many murders that took place in the first half of the 19th century. It remains more or less as it was in 1833, when Jean Rochette and Mr & Mrs Martin were executed. It is now surrounded by more modern buildings: a motel, a restaurant and a service station.
 The "ferme de Bourlatier" (in the commune of Saint-Andéol-de-Fourchades)

See also
Communes of the Ardèche department

References

Communes of Ardèche